The South Korean automobile manufacturer Kia has produced various cars, SUVs, and buses.

Passenger vehicles

Current models

Former models

Commercial vehicles

Concept cars

 Cub
 GT
 HabaNiro
 Imagine
 KCV III
 KCV-4 Mojave
 KED-10
 Kee
 KND-4
 KND-7
 KV7
 KOUP
 Kue
 Multi S
 Naimo
 Niro
 Pop
 Provo
 Rondo SX
 Rondo Taxi
 Slice
 Sonet
SP Concept
SP Signature
 Telluride
 EV9

KIA Defense
KLTV (also called K151) similar to the HMMWV
KM250 (K500 series) variant of the M35 truck
KM410 variant of the Willys M38A1 MD Jeep
KM420 Series (alternately K131) quarter ton Utility Vehicle
KM450 (K300 series) 1¼ ton modern variant of the M715
KM500 (K700 series) variant of the M809 truck both as 5 ton and 7 ton variants
KM1500 (K900 series) 8×8 heavy tactical truck
K53 Series similar to the Swedish Bandvagn 206 amphibious tracked vehicle

References

Kia